Laurent Boillat (17 April 1911 – 11 March 1985) was a sculptor and engraver. He was one of the founders of the Société des peintres et sculpteurs jurassiens (Society of Jura Painters and Sculptors, SPSJ).

Notable exhibitions
In 2005, an exhibition of Boillat's work was organized by the Musée jurassien d'art et d'histoire (Jura Museum of Art and History) at Delémont.

References

External links
http://www.laurentboillat.ch
Dictionnaire du Jura – Boillat, Laurent (1911–1985)

1911 births
1985 deaths
20th-century Swiss sculptors
20th-century Swiss male artists